Horatio Jackson may refer to:
Horatio Nelson Jackson (1872–1955), American physician and automobile pioneer
Thomas Horatio Jackson (1879–1935), Nigerian newspaper editor and publisher